
Sulęcin County is a unit of territorial administration and local government (powiat) in Lubusz Voivodeship, western Poland. It came into being on January 1, 1999, as a result of the Polish local government reforms passed in 1998.

As of 2019 its total population is 35,238, out of which the population of Sulęcin is 10,117, that of Torzym is 2,526, that of Lubniewice is 2,059, and the rural population is 20,536.

Neighbouring counties
Sulęcin County is bordered by Gorzów County to the north, Międzyrzecz County to the east, Świebodzin County to the south-east, Krosno Odrzańskie County to the south and Słubice County to the west.

Administrative division
The county is subdivided into five gminas (three urban-rural and two rural). These are listed in the following table, in descending order of population.

References

 
Land counties of Lubusz Voivodeship